Polyptychoides ruaha is a moth of the  family Sphingidae. It is known from Tanzania.

References

Polyptychoides
Moths described in 2004